Bilal Hassani (born 9 September 1999) is a French singer-songwriter and YouTuber. At the Eurovision final, Hassani finished in 16th place, with 105 points.

Biography
Hassani was born in Orsay, Paris Region to a Moroccan family from Casablanca. Her mother is a French citizen, while her father lives in Singapore. She has an older brother, Taha, who was born in 1995. She obtained her literary baccalaureate in 2017. Hassani is genderqueer and uses she/he pronouns.

2015–2018: Beginning of musical career 
In 2005, at the age of 5, Hassani began singing for her family, who had her start singing lessons.

In 2015, encouraged by her friend Nemo Schiffman, a finalist of the first season, Hassani participated in the second season of The Voice Kids and introduced herself in the blind auditions by singing a cover of "Rise Like a Phoenix" by Conchita Wurst, a singer whom she admires. She joined the team of judge Patrick Fiori. She was eliminated during the battle rounds by Swany Patrac.

In 2018, the LGBT magazine Têtu designated Hassani as one of the "30 LGBT+ [people] who move France". The magazine described her as "an icon for French LGBT+ youth".

2018–present: Eurovision Song Contest 
On 6 December 2018, Hassani was announced to be among the 18 candidates participating in Destination Eurovision, the French national selection process for the Eurovision Song Contest which was broadcast on France 2, with this edition choosing the representative of France at the Eurovision Song Contest 2019, which took place in Tel Aviv, Israel in May 2019.

On 20 December 2018, an excerpt from her song for the competition was released, the song titled "Roi" and written with the duo and 2018 winner of Destination Eurovision Madame Monsieur. The song was described to be about self-acceptance. On 4 January 2019, "Roi" was made available on all music platforms, and by 14 January, it had exceeded 3 million views. The newspaper Le Monde wrote that Hassani "leaves no one indifferent".

The initial front runner to represent France at Eurovision, Hassani began a media tour for Destination Eurovision on media outlets such as NRJ, Quotidien, and France Inter. On 12 January 2019, she won the semi-final by winning 58 out of 60 points awarded by the international jury, and winning 57 points (the highest score) from the French public. She totaled 115 points and qualified for the final, alongside Chimène Badi (66 points), Silvàn Areg (59 points) and Aysat (40 points). She won the final on 26 January 2019, with a total of 200 points including 150 of the French public while she was ranked fifth with the International Jury vote, with 50 points.

At the Eurovision Song Contest 2019 final, in Israel, Hassani performed the song "Roi", and placed 16th, with 105 points.

She appeared as herself in the 2020 movie Eurovision Song Contest: The Story of Fire Saga.

Personal life 
On 23 June 2017, Hassani publicly came out as part of the LGBTQ+ community, the day before she attended the Paris Pride.

Controversies 
Starting in December 2018, Hassani became the victim of cyber-harassment and has received homophobic and transphobic attacks and death threats. In response, the organizations Urgence Homophobie and Stop Homophobia joined forces to take legal action against anyone who has insulted, discriminated against or threatened Hassani on social networks, including Twitter. By 27 January 2019, the two organizations already identified 1,500 insulting, discriminating or hateful tweets because of her sexual orientation and/or physical appearance. Hassani later filed a complaint to those who may be potentially identified with these lawsuits, citing "insults, incitement to hatred and violence and homophobic threats".

On February 1, 2019, i24NEWS unveiled former Twitter tweets published on the singer's account in 2014, accusing Israel of crimes against humanity and taking the defence of Dieudonné, a French comedian known for his antisemitic sketches. A few hours later, the singer claimed on a video not to be the author of these tweets, which would have been written by a relative with access to her account, adding that she was 14 years old at the time. Soon after, a parody video from 2018 resurfaced, about the latest attacks committed in France, which gave rise to a new controversy. The senator of the Alpes Maritimes, Henri Leroy, requested that Bilal be "dismissed urgently from the contest".

Discography

Studio albums

Singles

Awards and nominations

Notes

References

External links

1999 births
21st-century French singers
Eurovision Song Contest entrants of 2019
Eurovision Song Contest entrants for France
French male singer-songwriters
French singer-songwriters
French people of Moroccan descent
French YouTubers
Gay musicians
LGBT YouTubers
French LGBT singers
Living people
Singers from Paris
21st-century French male singers
20th-century LGBT people
21st-century LGBT people
People with non-binary gender identities